A plough (or plow) is a tool used in farming for initial cultivation of soil.

Plough or The Plough may also refer to:

Science and technology
The Plough, or the Big Dipper, an asterism in the constellation of Ursa Major
Plough (instrument), a type of backstaff, a device used for celestial navigation
Plough (unit), or carucate, a medieval unit of land area
Plough, a device on electric trams powered by conduit current collection

Businesses and institutions
The Plough, Gorton, a pub in Manchester, UK
The Plough at Eaves, a pub in Lancashire, UK
The Plough Arts Centre, Torrington, North Devon, UK
Plough Inn, a heritage-listed hotel in Brisbane, Queensland, Australia
Plough Inn (Madison, Wisconsin), a building on the US National Register of Historic Places
Plough Company, the original holders of the patent on Lygonia, a proprietary province in pre-colonial Maine, US
Plough magazine and Plough Publishing House, a company operated by the Bruderhof Communities

Other uses
The Plough (film), a 2023 French-Swiss drama film directed by Philippe Garrel.
Plough pose, or Halasana, an asana in hatha yoga
"Plough", a song by Speedy Ortiz from Major Arcana

See also
Ploughshare (disambiguation)
Rotary snowplow
Snow plough